Kodi is a village in Kundapura taluk, Udupi district of Karnataka state in India. It is located on the Arabian Sea coast.

Kodi is known for its beach and the one-kilometer sea walk where dolphins can be spotted.

See also
 Delta Beach

References

External links
  South Canara district Gazetteer 1894 & 1938

Villages in Udupi district